Phragmataecia andarana is a species of moth of the family Cossidae. It is found in Namibia and South Africa.

References

Moths described in 1959
Phragmataecia
Moths of Africa
Insects of Namibia